White Hot: The Mysterious Murder of Thelma Todd is a 1991 American biographical drama television film directed by Paul Wendkos and written by Robert E. Thompson and Lindsay Harrison. Based on the 1989 non-fiction book Hot Toddy: The True Story of Hollywood's Most Sensational Murder by Andy Edmonds, the film is about the life of Hollywood comedic actress Thelma Todd, whose 1935 death was officially ruled accidental but has always been controversial. Loni Anderson as stars as Todd, alongside Maryedith Burrell, Robert Davi, Paul Dooley, Linda Kelsey, and John O'Hurley. It premiered on NBC on May 5, 1991.

Plot

Cast

Release
The film was released by itself, and as a "double feature" with another Loni Anderson television film, The Jayne Mansfield Story, starring Anderson in the title role.

External links
 

1991 television films
1991 films
1991 drama films
1990s American films
1990s biographical drama films
1990s English-language films
American biographical drama films
American drama television films
Biographical films about actors
Biographical television films
Films about Hollywood, Los Angeles
Films about murder
Films based on non-fiction books
Films directed by Paul Wendkos
Films scored by Mark Snow
Films set in 1935
NBC network original films
Television films based on books